Jack Mollinson Noreiga (15 April 1936 – 8 August 2003) was a West Indian cricketer who played in four Test matches in 1971.

An off-spinner, he took 9 for 95 in India's first innings in the Second Test in Port of Spain in 1970-71. He remains the only West Indian to take nine wickets in a Test innings.

External links
 
 Obituary

1936 births
2003 deaths
West Indies Test cricketers
Trinidad and Tobago cricketers
North Trinidad cricketers
East Trinidad cricketers